The Biophysical Journal is a biweekly peer-reviewed scientific journal published by Cell Press on behalf of the Biophysical Society. The journal was established in 1960 and covers all aspects of biophysics.

The journal occasionally publishes special issues devoted to specific topics. In addition, a supplemental "abstracts issue" is published, containing abstracts of presentations at the Biophysical Society Annual Meeting. The editor-in-chief is Jane Dyson.

History

The following persons are or have been editor-in-chief:

References

External links
 

Cell Press academic journals
Publications established in 1960
Biophysics journals
Biweekly journals
English-language journals
Academic journals associated with learned and professional societies